The 2009 Pacific typhoon season was a below average season that spawned only 22 named storms, 13 typhoons, and five super typhoons. It was also recognized as the deadliest season in the Philippines for decades. The first half of the season was very quiet whereas the second half of the season was extremely active. The season's first named storm, Kujira, developed on May 3 while the season's last named storm, Nida, dissipated on December 3.

During August, Typhoon Morakot, devastated Taiwan killing nearly 800 people and was known for being the deadliest typhoon to impact the country. Typhoons Ketsana and Parma both affected the Philippines bringing extreme flooding which killed more than 600 people with damages over US$300 million from both storms.

The scope of this article is limited to the Pacific Ocean to the north of the equator between 100°E and 180th meridian. Within the northwestern Pacific Ocean, there are two separate agencies that assign names to tropical cyclones which can often result in a cyclone having two names. The Japan Meteorological Agency (JMA) will name a tropical cyclone should it be judged to have 10-minute sustained wind speeds of at least  anywhere in the basin, whilst the Philippine Atmospheric, Geophysical and Astronomical Services Administration (PAGASA) assigns names to tropical cyclones which move into or form as a tropical depression in their area of responsibility located between 135°E and 115°E and between 5°N–25°N regardless of whether or not a tropical cyclone has already been given a name by the JMA. Tropical depressions that are monitored by the United States' Joint Typhoon Warning Center (JTWC) are given a number with a "W" suffix.


Seasonal forecasts 

During each season, several national meteorological services and scientific agencies forecast how many tropical cyclones, tropical storms, and typhoons will form during a season and/or how many tropical cyclones will affect a particular country. These agencies include the Tropical Storm Risk (TSR) Consortium of the University College London, Guy Carpenter Asia-Pacific Climate Impact Centre of the City University of Hong Kong (GCACIC) and Taiwan's Central Weather Bureau.

On January 4, PAGASA reported that they were expecting 19 or less tropical cyclones to affect the Philippines during 2009. During March, the TSR Consortium released their first forecast of the season and predicted that activity within the basin would be about 20% below normal with 25.6 tropical storms, 16 typhoons and 6.7 intense typhoons and an ACE index of around 247. Later that month the Hong Kong Observatory, predicted that the typhoon season in Hong Kong would be near normal with five to six tropical cyclones passing within  of the territory compared to an average of 6. During April, the GCACIC issued its first seasonal forecast for the year and predicted that the season would see activity near its average with 31 tropical cyclones, 27 tropical storms, and 18 typhoons occurring during the season. The GCACIC also predicted that 4 tropical cyclones would make landfall on Southern China between April and August compared to an average of 3, they also predicted that no tropical cyclones would make landfall between August and December. On May 7, TSR increased its forecast to 27.5 tropical storms, 17.6 typhoons, 9.1 "intense" typhoons and an ACE index of about 311 units, after La Niña conditions weakened and confidence grew that La Niña conditions would not return during 2009. Later that month the Vietnamese National Center for Hydro Meteorological forecasts predicted that six or more tropical cyclones would affect Vietnam during 2009.

During June, the GCACIC reported that the total number of tropical cyclones had decreased from 31 to 30, and that the total number of typhoons had increased to 19, while there was no change to the number of tropical storms predicted to occur during the season. They also predicted that 3 tropical cyclones would make landfall on Southern China between July and December compared to an average of 4. On June 30, the Taiwan Central Weather Bureau predicted that the season would see activity near its average of 26.6, and predicted that between 24 – 27 tropical storms would occur over the Western Pacific. The Central Weather Bureau also predicted that of the 24-27 tropical storms forecast 3-5 of them would affect Taiwan. In their July and August forecasts TSR upped their prediction for the amount of intense typhoons by one to ten and eleven respectively, whilst predicting the same amount of tropical storms and typhoons. In July and August they also predicted that the season would now see activity about 20% above normal. After their initial prediction was surpassed by Tropical Depression Tino forming, PAGASA announced that they expecting two or three more cyclones to affect the Philippines, before the end of the year.

Season summary 

The season started with Tropical Depression Auring east of the Philippines, which was then followed by Tropical Depression Bising a month later. After 2 months of inactivity, Tropical Depression Crising and Typhoon Kujira forms, and Kujira becoming the first major typhoon of the season, and was followed by the development of Typhoon Chan-hom in the South China Sea, and hit Pangasinan and crossed the Philippines. In mid-June, Severe Tropical Storm Linfa and Tropical Storm Nangka form and hit the Philippines.

It was followed 1 month later by Tropical Storm Soudelor, which passed through the Batanes Strait and headed for China, and followed by Tropical Depression Huaning which hit Taiwan. Typhoon Molave and Tropical Storm Goni head for China, while Typhoon Morakot becomes the most-costliest storm in Taiwanese history. Tropical Storm Etau briefly forms, and followed by Tropical Depression Maka from the Central Pacific basin, while Typhoon Vamco develops into a Category 4 but barely affects any major landmass. Krovanh peaks as a severe tropical storm, while Dujuan heads northeastward, and not affecting any landmass. Tropical Storm Mujigae forms in the South China Sea, which is followed by Typhoon Koppu, which crossed Northern Luzon. Typhoon Ketsana drops record rainfall in the Philippines, and is followed by Typhoon Parma which drops more rainfall to the already saturated Philippines. Typhoon Melor becomes a Category 5 while Nepartak briefly forms as a tropical storm, and Lupit becomes another Category 5 and nearly hits the Philippines before heading northeast. Typhoon Mirinae hits Central Luzon, causing more damages and misery to the Philippines. Tropical Depression Tino and Urduja briefly form, and Typhoon Nida (Vinta) becomes the strongest and final named storm of the season, which is then followed by a weak tropical depression in late December 2009. Due to many typhoons hitting the Philippines, the 2009 Pacific typhoon season was the costliest season for the Philippines on record.

Systems

Tropical Depression Auring 

Tropical Depression Auring formed as a tropical disturbance late on December 30, 2008, to the southeast of Manila in the Philippines. Over the next few days the disturbance gradually developed before early on January 3, both PAGASA and the JMA, reported that the disturbance had intensified into the first tropical depression of the season with PAGASA assigning the name Auring to the depression. As the depression was moving into a high level of vertical wind shear, it did not develop any further and late on January 5 as the baroclinic zone approached Auring, it was downgraded to a low-pressure area by PAGASA before the JMA followed suit the next day as it was declared as dissipated by the JTWC.

Heavy rain from Auring produced severe flooding in the eastern Philippines. Two people were killed and nine others were left missing. A total of 305 homes were destroyed and another 610 were damaged. About 43,851 people were affected by the depression and damages were estimated at PHP  ( USD).

Tropical Depression Bising 

Early the next morning after the depression had made landfall on Dinagat Island, PAGASA released its final advisory as the depression had weakened into an area of low pressure.

An estimated 473 passengers and several vehicles were stranded in Liloan and Ormoc due to ferry cancellations. In Cebu, an estimated 1,600 passengers were also stranded due to the depression. Late on February 13, the remnants of Bising brought scattered rainshowers across Southern Luzon, Bicol Region, and Visayas, then dissipated. The rainfall led to mudslides on Cebu Island which blocked the Cebu Transcentral Highway.

Tropical Depression Crising 

Deep convective banding was curving into an eastern southern edges of the disturbance. During the day the disturbance gradually consolidated further under the influence of an anticyclone, as a result of this the JTWC issued a Tropical Cyclone Formation Alert on the system. Later that day the JTWC reported that Crising's low-level circulation center has weakened and was now poorly organized as it underwent a Fujiwhara effect with what was to become Typhoon Kujira (Dante). PAGASA kept issuing advisories on Crising until it weakened into a low-pressure area early on May 1.

Heavy rains produced by the outer bands of Crising caused flooding in western areas of the Philippines, affecting an estimated 2,500 people. The worst flooding occurred in Lucena City where ten villages were isolated. Areas along the Bucon and Inalmasinan Rivers were inundated and sustained significant crop losses. Several animals reportedly drowned in the region. Several roads were impassable due to landslides or were washed out by floodwaters. One bridge was destroyed in the town of Mercedes.

Typhoon Kujira (Dante) 

Early on April 26, an area of disturbed weather formed near the coastline of Baler, capital of the Philippine's Aurora province. It was formerly a tail end of cold front that passed by Northern Luzon. JTWC assessed that the area of a disturbed weather potential of becoming developing into a significant Tropical Cyclone within 24 hours as "fair". However, on April 28, JTWC downgraded the disturbance as dissipating because of interaction with nearby middle Tropical Depression Crising and JMA Tropical Depression 03. A few days later, the disturbance moved south-westward, and late on April 30, the disturbance made landfall at Albay. On May 1, JTWC again upgraded the disturbance into having a potential to form into a significant Tropical Cyclone within 24 hours to "fair". And later that day, PAGASA classified the disturbance as a tropical depression, naming it "Dante" and issued public storm warning signal number one in the provinces of Camarines Norte, Camarines Sur, Albay, Sorsogon, Catanduanes, Masbate, Burias Island, and Southern Quezon. PAGASA also reported that Dante made landfall in the vicinity of Sorsogon within the Bicol region of the Philippines. Early on May 2, JTWC issued a TCFA as the depression was in an almost stationary position. Later that day, JMA classified Dante as a full depression. Early the next morning it became a tropical storm and was named Kujira. Kujira continued to strengthen and was upgraded to a severe tropical storm that afternoon.
When it was over the Philippines it killed 27 people while 9 others are missing. The JMA upgraded the system to a typhoon early on May 4. Kujira intensified quickly, doubling in strength from a Category 2 typhoon to a Category 4-equivalent typhoon within 24 hours. On May 6, The JTWC reported that Kujira was in its beginning stages of becoming extratropical, with the low-level circulation center almost fully exposed in association with increasing vertical wind shear and lower sea surface temperatures in the region. Late that, JMA downgraded Kujira to a Severe Tropical Storm as strong wind shear weakens the system. Then early on May 7, JTWC issued its last advisory on Kujira, already reporting it as an extratropical system. JMA continued to issue warnings on the system while at the same time it was downgraded to a tropical storm. Later on May 7, Kujira weakened further, becoming a fully extratropical cyclone .

While in the Philippine area of responsibility, Kujira caused some 625,709,464 worth of damage to crops and livestock in Albay, Camarines Norte, Masbate and Sorsogon. It also caused some 102 million pesos worth of damage to communal irrigation systems in the region. The NDCC update as of 6AM PST May 12 declared 28 dead, one missing and 5 injured. Further, 383,457 persons in 609 barangays of 60 municipalities and 4 cities in 5 provinces of Region V were affected by the storm. Damages are worth PhP 1,228,422,344 million or PhP1.228 billion of which PhP 625,709,464 are agricultural losses and PhP 529.525 million in infrastructural. Houses destroyed were at 2387, of which 138 were total and 2249 partial.

Typhoon Chan-hom (Emong) 

On May 1, an area of convectional cloudiness associated with an area of disturbed weather formed southeast of Nha Trang, Vietnam and associated with a remnant of Tropical depression Crising to form a new stronger area of disturbed weather system. JTWC monitored the disturbance as "Fair" for developing due to low vertical wind shear and an upper-level anticyclone to the east of the system. Later on the JMA designated the low pressure as a minor tropical depression reporting the outlook track as southwestward. The JTWC issued a TCFA on the system once the convection increased and became better organized although with an exposed LLC east of its convection. Early morning of May 3, the JMA begun issuing tropical cyclone advisories on the system forecasting it to become a tropical storm later in the afternoon as it tracked eastwards. On May 3, the JTWC designated the disturbance as Tropical Depression 02W, and the JMA named the storm Chan-hom. Later on May 4, Chan-hom strengthened into a severe tropical storm. On May 6, the system moved into the Philippine Area of Responsibility from the west and was named as Emong. Later that day the JMA upgraded the severe tropical storm to a typhoon. On May 7, PAGASA reported that Chan-hom had made landfall at the northern tip of Bani, Pangasinan. After traversing Pangasinan it lashed La Union, Ilocos Sur, Benguet, Nueva Vizcaya, Ifugao, Mt. Province, Kalinga and Isabela. Pangasinan (which recorded 150mm of rain from Emong) and La Union were the worst hit. The provinces in Central Luzon, Ilocos, Cordillera Administrative Region and Cagayan Valley, together with Metro Manila and parts of Southern Luzon, generally experienced more than 100 mm in the 24‑hour period on May 7. Rains, however, lasted from May 6–8. NDCC updates on 6:00AM on May 13 put dead at 50, injured at 47 and missing at 13 and damage worth 690 million pesos in agriculture, infrastructure and private property. It further left 204,000 persons affected, damaged 23280 houses of which 6080 are totally damaged and 17200 partially damaged in Pangasinan and induced 11 landslide occurrences in Zambales and Cagayan PAGASA expected the typhoon to weaken quickly, which it did. On May 8, Chan-hom was downgraded to a Tropical Storm and later, to a Tropical Depression. JMA issued its last warning early on May 9, followed by the JTWC. PAGASA held on to Emong (Chan-hom) until much later that day, when it was declared an area of low pressure. JTWC then re-issued advisories on the restrengthening depression on May 10. Later on May 11, Chan-hom became a subtropical depression, therefore, JMA and PAGASA designated it a tropical depression while JTWC declared it dissipated, PAGASA reported Tropical Depression Chan-hom degenerated into Subtropical Disturbance ex-Chan-hom and issued the final advisory for the system because it had almost completely dissipated. However, JMA did not issue the final advisory for the tropical depression until early on May 13, when the storm's low-level circulation dissipated and began accelerate northeastward, as it was caught up in the jet stream, at which time it was forecast to become extratropical or be absorbed by a cold front.

Severe Tropical Storm Linfa 

The disturbance had an elongated low-level circulation, with deep convection centered along the southwestern portion of the system. Over the next couple of days, the disturbance gradually developed with the JMA declaring the system as a tropical depression early on June 14 whilst the JTWC issued a TCFA. However the TCFA was cancelled later that day due to the convection dissipating, whilst the JMA downgraded the depression to an area of low pressure. Over the next two days, the system moved across Luzon and began to regenerate. Early on June 17, a second TCFA was released by the JTWC whilst the JMA reported that the system had re-intensified into a tropical depression. Following further development of the depression, the JTWC upgraded it to a tropical storm late on June 17. The JMA then followed suit early the next morning assigning the name Linfa to the storm. Throughout the rest of the day limited poleward outflow prevented linfa from intensifying. During June 19, Linfa intensified further and became a severe tropical storm with an eye feature starting to appear on microwave imagery. After interacting with a nearby upper-level low, outflow significantly improved later that day, fueling further strengthening, before the next day the JTWC upgraded Linfa to a typhoon as it reached its peak windspeeds of   10-minute winds). Later that day convection near the center of the circulation to decrease with the eye no longer visible. Upper-level wind shear rapidly increased, preventing re-intensification of the cyclone. Linfa then began to interact with land and was downgraded to a tropical storm by the JTWC on June 21 and then during that afternoon the storm made landfall on the southern Chinese province of Fujian. Deep convection then rapidly dissipated with both the JMA and the JTWC downgrading Linfa to a Tropical depression by early on June 22, as the storm moved away from the Chinese coastline. The system later dissipated just offshore with a circulation was no longer evident on satellite imagery.

A total of seven people were killed by Linfa, whilst $ (2009 USD) worth of damage was done by Linfa, as it affected China, Taiwan, Hong Kong and the Philippines. In Taiwan two people were hit by fallen trees, whilst power cuts were reported in Chiangchun as well as other parts of China and Taiwan. A total loss of NT$, ( 2009 USD) was suffered by the agricultural sector in Taiwan whilst in mainland China, Linfa produced torrential rainfall which led to severe flooding. Following a landslide, one person was killed. Flood waters destroyed 100 homes and inundated 10,000 others as well as an estimated 32,000 hectares of farmland in Fujian Province. In Meizhou, Guongdong Province, flash flooding resulted in five additional fatalities after 413.7 mm 19.22 in of rain fell within a nine-hour span. A total of 362 homes were destroyed in the town and infrastructure was severely damaged. Additionally, an estimated 20 million people were affected by the storm.

Tropical Storm Nangka (Feria) 

In the next few days, the disturbance showed improvement but, its LLCC was undefined. Early on June 20, the disturbance suddenly strengthened and its LLCC began to consolidate as well as significant banding all over the system. The disturbance was also located under low vertical wind shear. Early on June 22, JTWC issued an advisory that the potential of the formation of a significant tropical cyclone within 24 hours was upgraded to "Fair" because of its well-defined LLCC and was located in a favorable area. Around 0600 UTC that same day, the JMA classified the disturbance as a minor Tropical Depression, while the JTWC released a TCFA on the disturbance. This was because convection had begun to organize and upper-level analysis showed a cyclonic center on the east, just west of Guam and a cyclonic flow around its consolidating low-level circulation Centre. After 4 hours, JTWC issued its first warning and named it as Tropical Depression 04W. Early on June 23, PAGASA issued its first warning on the Tropical Depression and assigned its local named "Feria". In the afternoon, Nangka made its first landfall over Hernani, Eastern Samar at 5:00 pm PST (0900 UTC). and made its second landfall in Masbate around 10:00PM PST ( 1400 UTC). On June 24, Nangka rapidly slowed down while moving over Mindoro. The storm then made its third landfall at Calapan City, Mindoro at 12 am PST/ 0430 UTC. After crossing Mindoro for 8 hours, PAGASA downgraded Nangka into a Tropical Depression, while both the JMA and JTWC still classified Nangka as a tropical storm on that day. Early on June 25, Nangka move into the South China Sea, with PAGASA issuing their final warning. In the evening of that same day, both JMA and JTWC downgraded Nangka into a tropical depression due to its low-level circulation center is started to deteriorate. By midday of June 26, it made its fourth landfall in Guangdong province in China, passing through the northern part of Hong Kong. In the afternoon of that day, both JMA and JTWC issued their final warning on Nangka. Its remnants completely dissipated by June 27.

In Eastern Samar, more than 800 people were stranded after ferry service was canceled. High winds downed a large tree, destroying the roof of one home and damaging three cars. Unusually strong severe thunderstorms developed over parts of the Philippines along the outer bands of Nangka. In San Pascual, Bauan and Batangas City, large hail fell during a strong storm. Residents reported that they have never seen hail before. In Barangay, 4 in Bauan town, a rare tornado struck, downing several trees, damaging homes and signs. Heavy rains produced by the storm also flooded numerous regions, some reporting waist-deep water. Later reports confirmed the tornado destroyed 23 homes. In Cebu, one person was killed and seven were left missing. At least 500 people were also left homeless due to the storm. In Albay, more than 300 ship passengers were also stranded at the Albay port, Tabaco, Albay.

As of 24 June, Nangka (Feria) has caused 6 deaths and left 11 people missing. Property damage from the storm is estimated at PHP 2.8 million (US$54,000).

Tropical Storm Soudelor (Gorio) 

Deep convection was embedded in a broad, weak, poorly defined circulation that was starting to be enhanced by a tropical upper tropospheric trough (TUTT) cell to the east of the system. Over the next couple of days, gradual development took place before a TCFA was released by the JTWC early on July 9 as PAGASA designated the system as Tropical Depression Gorio. Later that day both the JMA and the JTWC reported that the depression had formed and started to issue warnings on the depression, with the JTWC designating it as 05W. On July 10, PAGASA issued their final advisory on Tropical Depression Gorio as it moved out of their area of responsibility. Hampered by an unfavorable upper-level environment, the depression barely intensified into a tropical storm early on July 11. Later that day the JTWC reported that Soudelor had weakened into a depression; however they re-upgraded it to a tropical storm as it moved closer to Hainan Province. Shortly before landfall in Leizhou Peninsula, China, the JTWC downgraded the storm to a tropical depression, then as Soudelor moved back over water and into the Gulf of Tonkin, the JTWC issued their final advisory on the depression, however the JMA continued to monitor the storm until it had made landfall near Fangchenggang, China several hours later.

In China torrential rains in Hainan caused significant flooding that killed 15 hikers and left several others missing. Numerous roads were also cut off or destroyed by landslides and 30 villages were inundated with flood waters. The remnants of Soudelor produced widespread torrential rains in Northern Vietnam on July 13. The capital city experienced flash flooding, inundating numerous streets and buildings. Two men were killed by lightning strikes associated with the storm. Officials reported that at least 13 large trees had been downed by high winds. One person was killed after being swept away. A tornado also touched down during the storm, destroying the roofs of three homes. Thousands of hectares of croplands were inundated by flood waters. Following the storm, 1,000 tonnes of rice was allocated for victims of the floods.

Tropical Depression 06W (Huaning) 

The convection was consolidating with a good mid-level circulation and was located under an anticyclone and had started to show some outflow into a trough to the northeast of the system. Early the next day the JMA reported that the disturbance had become a minor tropical depression. The depression then gradually developed during the rest of July 11, with PAGASA naming the depression as Huaning early on July 12 whilst the JTWC issued a Tropical Cyclone Formation Alert on the depression. Early the next day PAGASA upgraded Huaning into a tropical storm whilst the JTWC designated the depression as Tropical Depression 06W. Later that morning Huaning made its first landfall over Taitung City, Taiwan. On the next day, both JMA and JTWC issued their final warning on Huaning.

Typhoon Molave (Isang) 

Convection was wrapping into a poorly organized and drawn out low-level circulation center and was under minimal wind shear. It gradually developed further throughout the next day with convection continuing to consolidate over a low-level circulation center. However, early on July 12, the JTWC reported that the disturbance had dissipated, as outflow was being hampered by the outflow of Huaning. However, late on July 13, the JTWC reported that the disturbance had rapidly redeveloped and released a TCFA on the disturbance. Early the next day both PAGASA and the JMA designated the disturbance as a Tropical Depression with PAGASA assigning the local name of Isang to the depression. The Depression continued to develop and was designated as Tropical Depression 07W by the JTWC early on July 15, whilst PAGASA upgraded Isang to a Tropical storm later that day. On July 17, JMA upgraded Molave as a Severe Tropical Storm and Typhoon by PAGASA. On morning of July 18, HKO upgraded Molave as a Typhoon. Later that day, Molave quickly moved into the South China Sea. On July 19, at 1700 UTC or 1am HKT, Molave made its first landfall. In the afternoon, as Molave moved through China, both JMA and JTWC issued their final warning as Molave weakened into a tropical depression. Molave killed at least four people.

Tropical Storm Goni (Jolina) 

Deep convection was flaring around the low-level circulation center. An upper-level anticyclone and a tropical upper tropospheric trough was providing outflow. Over the next few days the disturbance gradually developed before the disturbance was declared as dissipated early on July 28 as the low-level circulation center was not well defined and higher vertical wind shear affecting the system. Later that day PAGASA reported that the disturbance had developed into a tropical depression and assigned its local name of Jolina. Jolina then intensified further early the next day and was reported to have become a tropical storm by PAGASA, with the JMA designating it as a depression later that day. Early on August 1 the JTWC issued a Tropical Cyclone Formation Alert as deep convection had increased and was starting to consolidate around a circulation center. However, later that morning Jolina made a landfall near to Casiguran, in the Philippine province of Aurora before emerging out into the South China Sea later that day. Early the next day the JTWC reissued their TCFA whilst PAGASA issued their final warning on Jolina as it moved out of their area of responsibility heading towards a landfall on China. The JTWC then designated the depression as 08W later that day as infrared imagery had shown deep convection was wrapping into the low-level circulation center. During August 3, the JMA reported that the tropical depression had intensified into a tropical storm and assigned the Goni to the cyclone. At 1700 UTC of August 4, Goni made its second landfall over Macau. Early on the next day, JTWC issued their final warning on Goni. On August 7, The Joint Typhoon Warning noted that remnant of Goni re-entered into the Gulf of Tonkin and had a poor chance of regenerating. Later in the day, Joint Typhoon Warning Center reissued advisories on the system upgrading it to a tropical storm near Hainan Island.

In the Philippines Goni (Jolina) death toll is 8 with 5 more missing. Goni (Jolina) affected 38,589 families or 160,038 people in 119 villages in 25 towns and five cities in Ilocos Sur, Batangas, Cagayan, Nueva Ecija, Rizal, Mindoro Occidental, Palawan, Iloilo, Negros Occidental, Lanao del Sur, and Sultan Kudarat town in Maguindanao.
Five people died in China when Goni passed through. In Hainan province about 92,000 people had been evacuated by the authorities. 575 houses were destroyed and 2,311 damaged. The storm also inundated than 68,000 hectares cropland.

Typhoon Morakot (Kiko) 

The depression remained weak, however, and later that day the JMA downgraded it to an area of convection. Still later that day, the JMA reported that the tropical depression had regenerated and that deep convection was flaring on the western side of a partially exposed low-level circulation center. On August 3, PAGASA named the depression Kiko as it moved through their area of responsibility, after which (the same day) the JMA named the storm Morakot, upgrading it to a Tropical Storm. The JTWC followed suit, designating Morakot as 09W. The next day Morakot recurved, reentering PAGASA's area of responsibility.

In the Philippines, ten villages (Paudpod, San Juan, Batonloc, Carael, Tampo, Paco, San Miguel, Bining, Bangan, and Capayawan) have been submerged in  floods after the Pinatubo Dike overflowed. Joint military and police rescue teams rescued 3 Koreans and 9 Canadian nationals. About 30,000 families were affected by Morakot; eleven people are confirmed dead. Three French tourists and two Filipino guides were killed in a flashflood caused by a landslide. Thousands are trapped on rooftops or in trees awaiting helicopter rescue attempts and thousands have lost their homes. At least two have died from flooding. Landslides have claimed the lives of two children and five miners are still missing after a landslide destroyed their huts. Schools have suspended their classes in the hardest hit area, and highways have been closed due to landslides.

In Taiwan, where schools were closed ahead of the typhoon, Morakot caused landslides, severe floods, blew down trees and billboards, and stripped roofs from buildings. In a positive impact, Morakot brought much-needed rain to Taiwan, ending a months-long drought, and replenished reservoirs enough to warrant an end to water rationing. In Taiwan, 461 people were killed with 192 missing. Almost the entire southern Taiwan (Chiayi, Tainan, Kaohsiung, and Pingtung) are flooded by record-breaking heavy rain. It is estimated that rainfall in Pingtung county may reach as much as 2,500 millimeters, breaking all rainfall records of any single place in Taiwan induced by a single typhoon.

South east China has evacuated 20,000 residents. A fishing boat has capsized and search and rescue efforts have begun for nine missing fishermen. A total of 34000 watercraft sought refuge ahead of the storm.

Tropical Storm Etau 

On August 6, an area of convectional cloudiness associated with monsoon through was located about (620 miles) 1000 km southwest of Iwo To, Japan. Satellite imagery shows an TUTT was located to the northeast of the system. and the system is also located under high vertical wind shear and favorable environment. Late of August 7, JTWC upgraded the system and issued a TCFA because LLCC is partially exposed. while JMA also upgraded the system as a minor tropical depression. On the next day, both JMA and JTWC classifies the minor tropical depression as a full depression. On August 8, JMA upgraded the system as a tropical storm and assigned the name Etau.

Tropical Depression Maka 

On August 13, the remnants of Tropical Storm Maka crossed the International Date Line and moved into the Western Pacific; where it was immediately designated as a tropical depression by the JMA. During the next day, the JTWC issued a Tropical Cyclone Formation Alert on the depression as the low-level circulation center had developed further. Later that day, the JTWC re-upgraded the disturbance to Tropical Depression 01C (Maka). Late the next day the JTWC upgraded the depression to a tropical storm however, the JMA still classified the storm as a depression.

Typhoon Vamco 

A low-level circulation center was developing with the deep convection starting to wrap into it whilst a tropical upper tropospheric trough was providing a good outflow for the center. Over the next couple of days the convection started to consolidate before early on August 16 a TCFA was issued by the JTWC as convective bands had started to wrap into the low-level circulation center. It was then declared as a Tropical depression later that day by the JMA however the JTWC did not follow suit until early the next day when they designated the depression as 11W with convective bands wrapping into a well-defined low-level circulation center. Both the JTWC and the JMA upgraded it to a tropical storm later that day, with the JMA assigning the name Vamco to the storm.

During August 18, the JMA reported that Vamco had intensified into a severe tropical storm and was moving towards the northwest slowly before early the next day along with the JTWC reporting that it had intensified into a weak typhoon. During that day Vamco kept intensifying due to being in favorable conditions with the JMA reporting that the typhoon had reached its peak wind speeds early on August 20 of  10-min Sustained, however the JTWC reported that it had continued to intensify during August 20, and reached its 1-minute peak wind speeds of  early on August 21 which made it a category four typhoon on the Saffir–Simpson hurricane scale. Vamco stayed at its peak wind speeds until early on August 22 when both the JMA and the JTWC reported that it had started to weaken, however due to the typhoon being in favorable conditions, Vamco was able to maintain its typhoon status until early on August 25, when the JTWC downgraded Vamco to an extra tropical low, and issued their final advisory. The JMA continued to monitor it as a severe tropical storm until early the next day when they downgraded it to an extratropical low as it approached the International Date Line. Vamco then crossed the International Date Line and was monitored as an extratropical low until late on August 28 when it dissipated to the south of Alaska.

Severe Tropical Storm Krovanh 

Satellite imagery shows that convective bands is starting to wrap into the Low-Level Circulation Centre (LLCC) and the system is located in moderate vertical windshear and favorable area. Early of August 28, the system is showing a good development LLCC then the JMA upgraded the system into a minor tropical depression. While JTWC issued a Tropical Cyclone Formation Alert (TCFA) on the system then after several hours, they upgraded it into a tropical depression. In the evening of that day, the depression rapidly intensified into a tropical storm due to hot water temperatures and associated with tropical upper tropospheric trough (TUTT) that located in the northeast of the tropical storm, whilst JMA assigned the name Krovanh. While JTWC also upgraded the depression into a tropical storm. Early of August 30, JMA upgraded Krovanh into a severe tropical storm. On the next day, Krovanh weakened into a tropical storm due to its interaction with the frontal system and the eye was quickly become visible. On September 1, both JMA and JTWC issued their final warning on Krovanh. The remnants of the storm was absorbed by a frontal system and dissipated later that day.

Tropical Depression 02C 

Late on August 29, the JMA started to issue warnings on Tropical Depression 02C as it was expected to cross the International Date Line and move into the Western Pacific within 24 hours and intensify into a Tropical Storm. Early the next day the depression crossed the dateline into an area of strong vertical windshear. Thus the tropical depression began to weaken with the low-level circulation center becoming fully exposed and sheared as a result the JTWC issued their final advisory later that day. However, the JMA continued to issue advisories on the depression until early on September 2, they downgraded the depression to an area of low pressure and issued their final advisory.

Severe Tropical Storm Dujuan (Labuyo) 

Satellite imagery revealed that a partial low-level circulation centre (LLCC) was exposed with an anticyclone providing good outflow that located to the northwest of the system. Early on September 1, the system showed a more defined LLCC moving through warm waters, whilst JMA upgraded the system to a tropical depression. On September 2, the depression entered the Philippine area of responsibility and PAGASA assigned it a local name Labuyo. On the next day, PAGASA upgraded Labuyo into a tropical storm while JTWC issued a TCFA. Later that day, JTWC designated it as tropical depression 13W. Early the next day, JMA upgraded the depression intensified into a tropical storm and assigned it an international name Dujuan, while JTWC then also upgraded Dujuan as a tropical storm. On September 5, JMA upgraded Dujuan into a severe tropical storm. Later that day, PAGASA issued their final warning on Labuyo as the storm moved out of their area of responsibility. Early of September 8, JTWC downgraded Dujuan into a tropical depression. After several hours of that same day, JTWC amended an issue that Dujuan was intensified again into a tropical storm.

September 2009 Vietnam tropical depression 

The system had a fully exposed low-level circulation center with small pockets of convection confined to the western edge of the cyclone. During the next couple of days the disturbance developed further with deep convection consolidating near the low-level circulation center before being designated as a tropical depression by the JMA and had a Tropical Cyclone Formation Alert issued by the JTWC early on September 3. Later the next day, it made a direct hit on Đà Nẵng, Quảng Nam and Quảng Ngãi, Vietnam and after several hours. Later that day, JTWC had cancelled TCFA. It had re-emerged back into the South China Sea and remained nearly stationary.

At least six people have been killed and five others were injured by the depression throughout Vietnam. Rainfall from the storm exceeded , triggering widespread flash flooding. Sixty-one tons of fish were swept away during the floods and 8,700 hectares of rice were destroyed.

Tropical Storm Mujigae (Maring) 

Satellite imagery shows that a mid-level convection consolidating in over a developing Low-Level Circulation Centre (LLCC). In additionally, there is a westerly wind burst that located three to five degrees of the system and located in moderate vertical wind shear. Late of September 8, the system is moving northwest and also in hot water temperatures, whilst the JMA upgraded the system into a tropical depression. Also, on the evening, PAGASA declared the system as a tropical depression and assigned its local name, Maring. While JTWC issued a Tropical Cyclone Formation Alert (TCFA). Early of the next day, JTWC upgraded the system into a tropical depression due to its LLCC is partially exposed. In the evening, as the tropical depression moved northwestward, PAGASA issued its final advisory as Maring moved out of their area of responsibility.,

Typhoon Choi-wan 

During that day the disturbance rapidly developed and was designated as a tropical depression early the next day by both the JMA and the JTWC before intensifying further and being named as Tropical Storm Choi-wan on September 12. During September 13, Choi-wan's rapid intensification slowed down barely intensifying into a severe tropical storm, before early the next day it was upgraded to a typhoon and rapidly intensified during the day to become a Category 4-equivalent typhoon.

With the help of excellent poleward outflow and high ocean heat content, Choi-wan remained at its peak intensity until early on September 17 when deep convection started to erode in the northwestern quadrant as the tropical upper tropospheric trough cell to the northwest was no longer providing good outflow. During September 19, Choi-wan rapidly weakened, as it moved into an unfavorable environment with higher amounts of vertical wind shear, causing the storm's deep convection to erode. As a result of this and dry latitude air wrapping into the low-level circulation center, the JTWC decided to downgrade Choi-wan to an extratropical system and issued their final advisory early the next day on September 20, before the JMA followed suit later that day. The JMA then reported that the extratropical low had dissipated completely, early on September 21.

Despite the intensity of Choi-wan when it passed over the Northern Marina Islands, there was no casualties reported. It was determined afterwards by the US Navy that the whole island of Alamagan was uninhabitable, with all but one of the structures, a facility for laboratory and research, completely destroyed and most of the islands' trees downed. As a result, it was determined that all of the residents of Alamagan and Agrihan needed to be completely evacuated to Saipan.

Typhoon Koppu (Nando) 

On September 9, an area of convectional cloudiness associated with the monsoon trough formed  to the northwest of Palau. Satellite imagery showed that a consolidating Low Level Circulation Centre (LLCC) with convection had started to develop and was wrapping toward the center. On September 11, the LLCC started to show improvement and was under moderate vertical shear with good westward outflow, but the JMA still upgraded the system to a minor tropical depression. Early of September 12, PAGASA upgraded the system in their responsibility and assigned its local name, Nando. At 1500 UTC, PAGASA reported that the depression made its landfall over northern Palanan, Isabela of the Philippines. However both JMA and JTWC reported that the depression did not make landfall but only crossed the Luzon strait. Early of the next day, JTWC upgraded the system into a tropical depression. Early of September 13, both JMA and JTWC upgraded the system as a tropical storm and assigned its international name, Koppu. In the afternoon, JMA reported that Koppu intensified into a severe tropical storm. On the 14th, the JMA reported that Koppu had intensified to a minimal typhoon, but the JTWC still kept Koppu as a tropical storm for the next few hours but later acknowledging the intensification and upgraded Koppu to a minimal typhoon. But the JTWC issued their final advisory early on September 15, as Koppu was moving over land, and was expected to dissipate quickly.

In Luzon, a 48-hour rainfall was experienced. In Visayas and Mindanao, a 24-hour rainfall was also experienced due to Nando's enhancing southwest monsoon. About 10 provinces were raised in signal warning no.1 from September 12 – September 13. Nando had triggered landslides resulting road closures and evacuations of some residents in Kalinga Province. The storm then caused major flood in Luoding, People's Republic of China.

Typhoon Ketsana (Ondoy) 

Satellite imagery showed deep convection starting to consolidate about an LLCC. In the afternoon of the next day, the system started showing good outflow in LLCC and was moving through moderate vertical shear whilst the JMA upgraded the system to a tropical depression. On the evening of the same day, the JMA reported that the depression weakened into an area of low pressure. In the afternoon of September 24, the JMA reported that the system was organizing again and was upgraded to a tropical depression again, while the PAGASA also upgraded the system to a tropical depression and assigned it the local name Ondoy. On the same day, the JTWC also issued a TCFA on the system. Early the next day, the JTWC upgraded the system to a tropical depression again. In the evening, the PAGASA reported that Ondoy intensified into a tropical storm. Early on September 26, the JTWC upgraded the depression to a tropical storm as well. At the same time, JMA also upgraded it as a tropical storm and assigned it the international designated name Ketsana.

In the Philippines, the whole archipelago experienced a torrential rain starting on September 23. more than 30 areas in Luzon, including Metro Manila, were placed under storm alerts as tropical storm "Ondoy" accelerated further and moved closer to Central Luzon. On Bicol region, ferry passengers were suspended during September 25 through the next day due to high waves and heavy rains that were brought by Ketsana into the region affecting about 2000 people. In the Manila International Airport, 13 flights were canceled due to Ketsana making landfall. Some universities in Manila suspended their classes due to severe flooding in some areas and heavy rainfall.

In addition, the PAGASA also advised residents living in low-lying areas and near mountain slopes in areas affected by the Southwest Monsoon and those under signals #1 and #2 (see below) are alerted against possible flashfloods and landslides. Also, PAGASA has alerted the National Disaster Coordinating Council (NDCC) for possible flashfloods and landslides in the affected areas, particularly in Laguna, Quezon, Zambales, Pampanga and Bataan provinces. Philippine Coast Guard commandant Admiral Wilfredo Tamayo also reminded owners of seacraft of a guideline barring travel for seacraft weighing 1,000 tons or less.

In Quezon City at the PAGASA Science Garden in NCR or Manila, torrential rains and 24‑hour Rainfall amounted to 455 mm the highest rainfall ever recorded in Metro Manila and belongs to the top 20 most rainiest typhoons to strike the Philippines. The amount of rainfall was 341.3 mm in just 6 hours from 8AM to 2PM on 26 September and an additional 83 mm fell for another 3 hours amounting to 424 mm in about 9 hours and the remaining 31 mm was light rain showers during the night before the epic flood and the evening of 26 September and 111 mm fell on 25 September. Bulacan also experienced an unusually high rainfall amount leading to the widespread and massive flooding in the province and overflowing of the Angat dam and opening of the floodgates at about 10:45 am.

A total of 25 provinces and Metro Manila were placed under state of calamity, with Metro Manila experiencing a record amount of rainfall in 42 years, with rain falling between 8:00 a.m. and 2:00 p.m. of September 26 pegged at 341 mm, over the record established in June 1967 at 334 mm.

Tropical Depression 18W 

Deep convection had started to consolidate and wrap around the low-level circulation centre. By September 26, the system had developed strong outflow and was intensifying with the JMA reporting later that day that it had become a tropical depression however the JTWC did not follow suit until early the next day when they assigned the designation of 18W to the depression. During the next couple of days very little intensification took place as convection barely deepened around the low-level circulation center and in fact weakened due to the precursor system to Typhoon Parma was developing to the southeast of 18W. As 18W approached Guam, the system became severely disrupted after interaction with what were to become Typhoons Melor and Parma. As it passed near the island, the storm rapidly dissipated, first weakening to a depression and then as it lost its low-level circulation centre it was no longer considered a tropical cyclone and thus the final warnings from the JTWC and the JMA were issued.

Despite a state of emergency being declared by the Governor of Guam before the depression affected Guam on September 29, it had very little impact on Guam. With only increased winds and moderate rainfall reported. All flights in and out of Guam were cancelled until the storm had passed. Five ships and a submarine from the United States Navy moved out to sea to avoid the storm; however, one submarine was unable to leave and remained at port during the storm.

Typhoon Parma (Pepeng) 

Early on September 25, an area of convectional cloudiness associated with the monsoon through formed  to the southeast of Palau. Satellite imagery showed a consolidating Low Level Circulation Centre. On September 27, the system began improving and showing a partial LLCC due to favorable conditions and was also located under moderate vertical wind shear, whilst the JMA upgraded the system into a tropical depression. On the evening of that day, the JTWC issued a Tropical Cyclone Formation Alert. On the next day, JMA reported that the depression had intensified into a tropical storm, submitting its international designated name, Parma. Also, on September 28, JTWC upgraded it to a tropical depression.

On the next day, JTWC again upgraded the depression into a tropical storm. And, by early September 30, due to the storm moving through warm water temperatures, the JTWC and JMA upgraded it to a Category 1 typhoon. Satellite imagery also began showing that an eye wall structure had formed. Intensification continued into the morning of the next day, reaching Category 3 status. Then, after four hours, Parma rapidly strengthened to a Category 4 super typhoon, reaching its peak strength. Different weather bureaus forecasted that Parma would intensify into a Category 5 super typhoon, however, it weakened in the afternoon of October 1 as the eye of Parma began to degrade due to its movement into unfavorable conditions. Parma continued to slightly weaken while moving through the area of Cagayan, then by midday of October 3, it was downgraded into a Category 3-equivalent typhoon.

Before it made landfall over northern Cagayan at 3:00 pm PST (07:00 UTC), it weakened into a Category 2 typhoon. Parma crossed northern Luzon over 12 hours, during which the typhoon weakened into a category 1 equivalent typhoon. PAGASA reported that the typhoon was moving almost stationary in their area of responsibility due to interaction with Typhoon Melor and a ridge of high-pressure area over mainland China. At the same time, JTWC downgraded Parma into a tropical storm while the JMA downgraded it into a severe tropical storm. Early the next day, satellite imagery revealed that Parma had an eye center but no convectional cloudiness due to high pressure. Intensification was unlikely because of unfavorable environment conditions and interaction with Typhoon Melor.

On October 6, at 11:00 pm PST (15:00 UTC), Parma made its second landfall over Ilocos Norte as it moved to the southeast. In the afternoon of the next day, PAGASA reported that Parma weakened into a tropical depression near the Isabela area, while both JMA and JTWC still classified Parma as a tropical storm. In the morning of October 8, it emerged back into waters near Isabela. After four hours, Parma made its third landfall in Cagayan. The next day, Parma crossed Northern Luzon for the third time. Then by the afternoon of that day, Parma exited La Union and emerged back into the South China Sea. As it moved out into the Philippine area of responsibility, then PAGASA issued their final warning on Parma.

On October 10, both JMA and JTWC reported that Parma reintensified into a tropical storm while it was over the South China Sea. Intensification was almost difficult due to moderate vertical wind shear.

Then by late of October 12, it made its fourth landfall over Hainan Island in China. Early on October 14, Parma was downgraded by JMA to a tropical depression because there was a lack of convection. Then by the afternoon of that day, it made its fifth landfall over the coastline of Vietnam. In the evening, JMA reported that Parma weakened into an area of low pressure, becoming the agency issues their final advisory. However, JTWC still considered Parma as a tropical storm.

The names Parma and Pepeng were retired at the end of the season.

At least 500 people were killed by Parma.

Typhoon Melor (Quedan) 

On September 28, an area of convectional cloudiness formed  to the northeast of Pohnpei. Satellite imagery showed a Low Level Circulation Centre had begun to form. On the evening of September 28, due to a TUTT that was providing good outflow for the system and low-level vertical wind shear with a favorable environment, the JTWC issued a Tropical Cyclone Formation Alert. Early on September 29, both JMA and JTWC upgraded the system into a tropical depression. Early on September 30, JMA reported that the depression had intensified into a tropical storm and assigned its international designated name, Melor. At the same time JTWC also classified the depression as a tropical storm. Early on October 1, Melor intensified further from a severe tropical storm into a typhoon. Intensification continued, and by the afternoon of the same day the JTWC reported that Melor had intensified into a Category 1-equivalent typhoon. In just four hours, it intensified rapidly to a Category 3-equivalent typhoon, and continued to track towards northeast Luzon. Early on October 2, it strengthened to a Category 4-equivalent typhoon. After levelling out in intensity, it strengthened again on October 3. Early October 4, JTWC reported that Melor had intensified to a Category-5 equivalent super typhoon, with JMA reporting a central pressure of 910 hPa and winds of 205 km/h. On October 5, PAGASA allocated the name Quedan to the typhoon as the storm moved into Philippine's area of responsibility. It interacted with Typhoon Parma in Parma's second landfall in the Philippines. By the midday of October 8, Melor made landfall on Japan. After landfall, JMA downgraded Melor into a severe tropical storm, while the JTWC downgraded it into an extratropical storm. Late on October 11, the extratropical remnants of Melor were completely absorbed by a newly formed extratropical storm system to the north, near Alaska. This system then strengthened and began to impact the West Coast of the United States, late on October 11.

Tropical Storm Nepartak 

On October 6, an area of convectional cloudiness associated with the monsoon trough formed  to the southwest of Saipan. Satellite imagery showed a consolidating Low Level Circulation Center with formative convective banding and deep convection over the northern semicircle. During the morning of October 8, the system started to move northwest and its LLCC rapidly became well defined due to favorable conditions. The JMA then upgraded it to a tropical depression, and the JTWC issued a TCFA on the system, as it had started to become better defined. Then in the evening of that day, it was upgraded into a tropical depression by the JTWC. On October 9, the JMA upgraded it to a tropical storm and assigned its international name Nepartak.

Typhoon Lupit (Ramil) 

The convection had a broad circulation center that was beginning to consolidate in an area of low vertical windshear and favorable sea surface temperatures. Later that day, as the low-level circulation center had consolidated further, the JTWC released a Tropical Cyclone Formation Alert before early the next day both the JMA and the JTWC initiated advisories on the system as it had intensified into Tropical Depression 22W. During that day the depressions low-level circulation center continued to organize with deep convective bands starting to wrap into the center.

The convection was disorganised but was starting to consolidate around a broad low-level circulation center within a favourable environment to develop further with good vertical windshear and favourable sea surface temperatures. The disturbance rapidly developed throughout that day with a Tropical Cyclone Formation Alert issued later that day by the JTWC before advisories were initiated early the next day by the JMA and the JTWC who designated it as Tropical Depression 22W before the JTWC reported that the depression had intensified into a weak tropical storm. On October 15, JMA upgraded it to a Tropical Storm with the name Lupit. On the afternoon of next day, JTWC reported that Lupit strengthened into a Category 1 typhoon. That evening, PAGASA started issuing warnings on Lupit as it entered into their area of responsibility and assigned its local name, Ramil. At the same time JMA also upgraded Lupit into a typhoon. Intensification continued due to favorable conditions and hot water conditions, then by October 17, it rapidly intensified into a Category 3-equivalent typhoon. In the morning of the next day, it strengthened into a Category 4 typhoon, then strengthened further to Super Typhoon classification. On October 20, Lupit weakened to a minimal typhoon. By the 24th, dry air entrainment and an unfavorable environment had weakened Lupit further to a strong tropical storm, and caused the storm to change track from its westward drift to accelerate northeastward. Later that day, JTWC and PAGASA issued their final warning as Lupit was beginning extratropical transition. However, the JMA continued to issue warnings on Lupit until early on October 27.

Typhoon Mirinae (Santi) 

JMA upgraded a Tropical Depression to Tropical Storm Mirinae on October 27, and it rapidly strengthened to a Typhoon, to a peak of 105-110 mph. It did not strengthen much further, due to wind shear and its fast movement. PAGASA allocated the name Santi to the system the next day, as the storm had entered their area of responsibility. Then Mirinae crossed the Philippines, causing it to rapidly deorganize and was downgraded from a Category 2 Typhoon, to a tropical storm in one advisory. It then crossed into the South China Sea, and slowly, but steadily strengthened until it was very close to Vietnam. Where it intensified to a Typhoon again. It made landfall and rapidly weakened.

Mirinae's main effect in the Philippines is the strong winds it brings. From the night of October 30 until the next day, Southern Luzon, including Metro Manila, experienced lashing winds from the typhoon, where in Manila, minimal tropical storm force winds were at 39 m/h with gusts of 56 m/h at 6 a.m. local time, thus downing trees and made significant damage to several infrastructures. During Mirinae's passage in the Philippines, rainfall amounts from the typhoon were less than six inches recorded. Casualties from Mirinae both in the Philippines and Vietnam reached 162, with cost of damage amounting to $295 million (2009 USD).

Tropical Depression 24W (Tino) 

Deep convection had started to form over a low-level circulation center. The JMA then reported early the next day that the disturbance had intensified into a weak tropical depression. However at this time the JTWC did not upgrade the disturbance to a tropical depression, instead issuing a Tropical Cyclone Formation Alert later that day as the depressions poleward outflow improved. Later that day the JTWC designated the depression as 24W, despite the system now encountering unfavorable levels of vertical windshear which made the low-level circulation center become fully exposed with no deep convection existing near the center. As a result of this early on November 3, the JMA, the JTWC and PAGASA all issued their final advisories.

Tropical Depression 25W 

An area of low-pressure formed near the International Date Line on November 1. The convection was poorly organized and was located in a monsoon trough amidst a weak and elongated circulation with weak mid-level turning. However, environmental conditions were not favourable for the disturbance to develop as it was located in an area of moderate vertical windshear. Over the next few days the disturbances gradually developed a low-level circulation center and as a result was designated as a tropical depression early on November 7 by both the JMA and the JTWC.

Tropical Depression 27W (Urduja) 

On November 23, PAGASA announced that a low-pressure area east of Mindanao had developed into a Tropical Depression and had been named "Urduja". The same day JTWC designated the tropical depression as 27W. Early Of November 25, the depression has weakened into an area of low pressure. The remnants of Urduja were absorbed into Typhoon Nida during November 25 and 26.
In Eastern Visayas, 1, 519 passengers were stranded, 719 in Western Visayas, 399 in Bicol and 185 in Southern Luzon due to Urduja. In all, four people were killed by Urduja, three due to a landslide and one from electrocution.

Typhoon Nida (Vinta) 

At this time the system was moving around the subtropical ridge of pressure, with an anticyclone over the cyclone helping the convection to consolidate over a broad and elongated low-level circulation center which was located in an area of minimal vertical wind shear. Later that morning a Tropical Cyclone Formation Alert was released as deep convection increased in organization with multiple bands of convection starting to wrap into the developing low-level circulation center. The system was then declared as a tropical depression by the JMA later that day before the JTWC followed suit early the next day, who assigned the designation of 26W to the depression. On November 23, the JTWC upgraded the system to a tropical storm, and JMA followed suit allocating the name Nida. Later the next day, JTWC reported that Nida rapidly intensified into the equivalent of a category 1 typhoon. The next day JMA upgraded Nida to a Severe Tropical Storm Intensification was anticipated until in the afternoon of November 25, then JTWC reported that Nida intensified from category 2 to a category 4 super typhoon equivalent. While JMA also upgraded it to typhoon status. At the same time an eye wall structure had formed. Nida became the first storm of this intensity in the basin in terms of 10-minute winds (JMA) since Typhoon Jangmi in 2008. Additionally, the JMA reported that the barometric pressure had decreased to 905 mbar, ranking Nida as the strongest storm to form during 2009 worldwide, only slightly eclipsing Hurricane Rick's intensity. Later, Nida was downgraded to a category 4 equivalent, due to an eyewall replacement cycle, but shortly regained strength, and on November 28, Nida re-intensified to a Category 5 typhoon. It later stalled and remained quasi-stationary for some time while briefly expanding tremendously in size, then gradually weakening and shrinking into a Category 1 typhoon by November 30. While the typhoon weakened, it created a large gap in the Subtropical Ridge and sent moisture into the subtropical jet, where intense storms formed in the North Pacific. By December 2, Nida began to move northward slowly, while weakening further to JMA Tropical Storm status. On December 3, Nida weakened into a PAGASA tropical depression and on the same day JTWC issued a Final Warning. However, on December 4, part of its remnants were absorbed into the Jet Stream, and the other part of the main convection remained in position to merge with Tropical Depression 28W. And thus, the remnants of Nida dissipated completely on December 4. Nida was one of the most intense cyclones ever to develop in the month of November.

Tropical Depression 28W 

Deep convection was slowly consolidating around a poorly defined low-level circulation centre, in an area of moderate to high vertical wind shear. Over the next couple of days the moderate to high vertical wind shear prevented the disturbance's low-level circulation centre from consolidating further. On December 2, the JTWC issued a TCFA as the disturbance moved close to the upper-level ridge axis which was providing an area of low vertical wind shear and gave the system a good chance of development within 12–24 hours. During the next day, the JMA reported that the disturbance had intensified into a tropical depression before the JTWC cancelled the TCFA and downgraded the depression's chance of becoming a significant tropical cyclone within 24 hours to poor, as the low-level circulation center had become elongated and exposed whilst deep convection had become poorly organized and displaced. As a consequence of the depression moving into an area of higher vertical wind shear, deep convection had become sheared to the north and northwest of the centre. Throughout December 4, the JTWC assessed the depression's chances of becoming a significant tropical cyclone within 24 hours as poor. The JMA then downgraded the tropical depression to an extratropical low, later that day.

Other systems 
The JTWC briefly issued a TCFA on the system during the next day. The tropical depression meandered northward until it was last noted on May 4 when it became an extratropical low. However the JMA discontinued tracking on the system by the next day.

As it moved northward the system started to weaken after its convection remained weak, therefore, the system dissipated on September 26. By October 17, the JTWC issued a TCFA, although it was canceled few hours later. As the system's center became exposed and as it entered unfavorable environments, the system dissipated on October 20. On November 24, the JMA started to monitor a weak tropical depression to the northeast of Borneo. Although the system did not organize further and weakened to a low-pressure during the next day. On December 7, a weak tropical depression had formed to the east of Mindanao, Philippines until it fully dissipated during December 8.

Storm names 
Within the North-western Pacific Ocean, both the Japan Meteorological Agency (JMA) and the Philippine Atmospheric, Geophysical and Astronomical Services Administration assign names to tropical cyclones that develop in the Western Pacific, which can result in a tropical cyclone having two names. While the Philippine Atmospheric, Geophysical and Astronomical Services Administration assigns names to tropical cyclones which move into or form as a tropical depression in their area of responsibility located between 135°E and 115°E and between 5°N-25°N even if the cyclone has had an international name assigned to it. The names of significant tropical cyclones are retired, by both PAGASA and the Typhoon Committee.

International names 

During the season 22 named tropical cyclones developed in the Western Pacific and were named by the Japan Meteorological Agency, when it was determined that they had become tropical storms. These names were contributed to a list of a 140 names submitted by the fourteen members nations and territories of the ESCAP/WMO Typhoon Committee. The names Molave, Mujigae and Mirinae were used for the first time as it was replaced from Imbudo, Maemi and Sudal from the 2003 and 2004 seasons respectively.

Philippines 

The Philippine Atmospheric, Geophysical and Astronomical Services Administration uses its own naming scheme for tropical cyclones in their area of responsibility. PAGASA assigns names to tropical depressions that form within their area of responsibility and any tropical cyclone that might move into their area of responsibility. Should the list of names for a given year prove to be insufficient, names are taken from an auxiliary list, the first 10 of which are published each year before the season starts. The names not retired from this list were used again in the 2013 season. This is the same list used in the 2005 season, except for Urduja which replaced Undang, because the name Undang had been retired in the 1984 season. The names Ramil, Santi, Tino, Urduja and Vinta were used for the first time this year.

Retirement 

The names Morakot, Ketsana, and Parma were retired by the ESCAP/WMO Typhoon Committee. The names Atsani, Champi, and In-fa were chosen to replace Morakot, Ketsana and Parma respectively.

The Philippine Atmospheric, Geophysical and Astronomical Services Administration (PAGASA) announced that Typhoons Feria, Ondoy and Pepeng had their names retired after they both caused over 300 deaths and 1 billion PHP worth of damage in the Philippines.
In June 2012, the names Fabian, Odette and Paolo were chosen by PAGASA to replace Feria, Ondoy and Pepeng respectively.

Season effects 
This table will list all the storms that developed in the northwestern Pacific Ocean west of the International Date Line and north of the equator during 2009. It will include their intensity, duration, name, areas affected, deaths, and damage totals. Classification and intensity values will be based on estimations conducted by the JMA. All damage figures will be in 2009 USD. Damages and deaths from a storm will include when the storm was a precursor wave or an extra tropical low.

|-
| Auring ||  || bgcolor=#| || bgcolor=#| || bgcolor=#| || Philippines ||  ||  ||
|-
| Bising ||  || bgcolor=#| || bgcolor=#| || bgcolor=#| || Philippines ||  None || None ||
|-
| Crising ||  || bgcolor=#| || bgcolor=#| || bgcolor=#| || Philippines ||  None || None ||
|-
| Kujira (Dante) ||  || bgcolor=#| || bgcolor=#| || bgcolor=#| || Philippines, Russian Far East ||  ||  ||
|-
| TD ||  || bgcolor=#| || bgcolor=#| || bgcolor=#| || None ||  None || None ||
|-
| Chan-hom (Emong) ||  || bgcolor=#| || bgcolor=#| || bgcolor=#| || Vietnam, Philippines, Ryukyu Islands ||  ||  ||
|-
| Linfa ||  || bgcolor=#| || bgcolor=#| || bgcolor=#| || Philippines, Taiwan, China ||  ||  ||
|-
| Nangka (Feria) ||  || bgcolor=#| || bgcolor=#| || bgcolor=#| || Philippines, China ||  ||  ||
|-
| Soudelor (Gorio) ||  || bgcolor=#| || bgcolor=#| || bgcolor=#| || Philippines, China, Vietnam ||  ||  ||
|-
| 06W (Huaning) ||  || bgcolor=#| || bgcolor=#| || bgcolor=#| || Taiwan, China ||  None || None ||
|-
| Molave (Isang) ||  || bgcolor=#| || bgcolor=#| || bgcolor=#| || Philippines, Taiwan, China ||  ||  ||
|-
| Goni (Jolina) ||  || bgcolor=#| || bgcolor=#| || bgcolor=#| || Philippines, China, Vietnam ||  Minor ||  ||
|-
| Morakot (Kiko) ||  || bgcolor=#| || bgcolor=#| || bgcolor=#| || Philippines, Japan, Taiwan, China, Korea ||  ||  ||
|-
| Etau ||  || bgcolor=#| || bgcolor=#| || bgcolor=#| || Japan ||  ||  ||
|-
| Maka ||  || bgcolor=#| || bgcolor=#| || bgcolor=#| || None ||  None || None ||
|-
| Vamco ||  || bgcolor=#| || bgcolor=#| || bgcolor=#| || None ||  None || None ||
|-
| TD ||  || bgcolor=#| || bgcolor=#| || bgcolor=#| || Japan ||  None || None ||
|-
| TD ||  || bgcolor=#| || bgcolor=#| || bgcolor=#| || None ||  None || None ||
|-
| Krovanh ||  || bgcolor=#| || bgcolor=#| || bgcolor=#| || Japan ||  None || None ||
|-
| 02C ||  || bgcolor=#| || bgcolor=#| || bgcolor=#| || None ||  None || None ||
|-
| Dujuan (Labuyo) ||  || bgcolor=#| || bgcolor=#| || bgcolor=#| || Mariana Islands ||  None || None ||
|-
| TD ||  || bgcolor=#| || bgcolor=#| || bgcolor=#| || Vietnam ||  ||  ||
|-
| Mujigae (Maring) ||  || bgcolor=#| || bgcolor=#| || bgcolor=#| || Philippines, China, Vietnam ||  ||  ||
|-
| Koppu (Nando) ||  || bgcolor=#| || bgcolor=#| || bgcolor=#| || Philippines, China ||  ||  ||
|-
| Choi-wan ||  || bgcolor=#| || bgcolor=#| || bgcolor=#| || Mariana Islands ||  Minor || None ||
|-
| TD ||  || bgcolor=#| || bgcolor=#| || bgcolor=#| || Mariana Islands ||  Minor || None ||
|-
| Ketsana (Ondoy) ||  || bgcolor=#| || bgcolor=#| || bgcolor=#| || Philippines, Vietnam, Laos, Cambodia, Thailand ||  ||  ||
|-
| 18W ||  || bgcolor=#| || bgcolor=#| || bgcolor=#| || Mariana Islands, Caroline Islands ||  None || None ||
|-
| Parma (Pepeng) ||  || bgcolor=#| || bgcolor=#| || bgcolor=#| || Caroline Islands, Philippines, Taiwan, China, Vietnam ||  ||  ||
|-
| Melor (Quedan) ||  || bgcolor=#| || bgcolor=#| || bgcolor=#| || Caroline Islands, Mariana Islands, Japan ||  ||  ||
|-
| Nepartak ||  || bgcolor=#| || bgcolor=#| || bgcolor=#| || Mariana Islands ||  None || None ||
|-
| Lupit (Ramil) ||  || bgcolor=#| || bgcolor=#| || bgcolor=#| || Caroline Islands, Philippines, Japan ||  Minor || None ||
|-
| TD ||  || bgcolor=#| || bgcolor=#| || bgcolor=#| || Vietnam, China ||  None || None ||
|-
| Mirinae (Santi) ||  || bgcolor=#| || bgcolor=#| || bgcolor=#| || Caroline Islands, Mariana Islands, Philippines, Vietnam, Cambodia, Laos, Thailand ||  ||  ||
|-
| 24W (Tino) ||  || bgcolor=#| || bgcolor=#| || bgcolor=#| || Philippines ||  None || None ||
|-
| 25W ||  || bgcolor=#| || bgcolor=#| || bgcolor=#| || None ||  None || None ||
|-
| 27W (Urduja) ||  || bgcolor=#| || bgcolor=#| || bgcolor=#| || Philippines ||  Minor ||  ||
|-
| Nida (Vinta) ||  || bgcolor=#| || bgcolor=#| || bgcolor=#| || Caroline Islands, Mariana Islands ||  Minor || None ||
|-
| TD ||  || bgcolor=#| || bgcolor=#| || bgcolor=#| || Malaysia, Indonesia, Thailand ||  None || None ||
|-
| 28W ||  || bgcolor=#| || bgcolor=#| || bgcolor=#| || None ||  None || None ||
|-
| TD ||  || bgcolor=#| || bgcolor=#| || bgcolor=#| || Philippines ||  None || None ||
|-

See also 

 Tropical cyclones in 2009
 Pacific typhoon season
 2009 Pacific hurricane season
 2009 Atlantic hurricane season
 2009 North Indian Ocean cyclone season
 South-West Indian Ocean cyclone seasons: 2008–09, 2009–10
 Australian region cyclone seasons: 2008–09, 2009–10
 South Pacific cyclone seasons: 2008–09, 2009–10
 Effects of the 2009 Pacific typhoon season in the Philippines

Notes

References

External links 

 Satellite movie of 2009 Pacific typhoon season

 
Pacific typhoon seasons
Articles which contain graphical timelines
2009 WPac